Kristian Yli-Hietanen (born 31 May 1996) is a Finnish professional footballer who plays as a forward for FC Haka in the Veikkausliiga.

Early life
Born in Tampere, Finland, Yli-Hietanen began playing youth soccer with Ilves, In 2007, he moved to North Vancouver, British Columbia in Canada with his family, where he played youth soccer with North Vanocuver FC. After graduating high school at Sutherland Secondary School, he was not recruited by any university programs and began working construction as a labourer and a painter.

University career
In 2015, he began attending Capilano University, where he was the 2015 PACWEST Player of the Year and Rookie of the Year, as well as  Golden Boot award winner after scoring eight goals in 14 league games. He also helped Capilano win the PACWEST Gold Medal and the national CCAA silver medal and was named a CCAA All-Canadian and CCAA Tournament All-Star. In February 2016, he decided to transfer to Simon Fraser University, however, he ultimately remained with Capilano instead for 2016. In 2016, they repeated as PACWEST Gold medalists and won the CCAA bronze medal.

In 2017, following two successful seasons with the Capilano University men's soccer team, Yli-Hietanen would move on to the University of British Columbia. On September 30, 2018, he scored 4 goals in a game against the University of North British Columbia Timberwolves. While in university, he also played amateur senior soccer with Rino's Tigers in the Vancouver Metro Soccer League from 2017 to 2019.

Club career
In 2017, he played for TSS FC Rovers in the Premier Development League. He would return to TSS FC for the 2019 season, scoring once in seven appearances.

In 2020, he returned to Finland, signing with Tampereen Pallo-Veikot (TPV) of the third tier Kakkonen.

In 2021, Yli-Hietanen approached Reipas Lahti and went on trial with them, where he was recommended to the top tier side FC Lahti, where he signed a contract. He scored his first goal in a 2021 Finnish Cup match against KTP on February 13.

In 2022, he joined Käpylän in Kakkonen.

On 9 January 2023, it was announced that Yli-Hietanen had signed a 1+1 year contract with FC Haka in the Veikkauslliga.

Career statistics

Club

Notes

References

External links
Kristian Yli-Hietanan at the Capilano University
Kristian Yli-Hietanan at the University of British Columbia

1996 births
Living people
Footballers from Tampere
Capilano University alumni
University of British Columbia alumni
Finnish footballers
Canadian soccer players
Association football forwards
Kakkonen players
Veikkausliiga players
USL League Two players
FC Ilves players
TSS FC Rovers players
Tampereen Pallo-Veikot players
Reipas Lahti players
FC Lahti players
FC Haka players